Chiara Bonacchi  is an archaeologist. She is Senior Lecturer at the University of Stirling.

Career
Bonacchi has a BA in Archaeology and an MA in Medieval Archaeology from the University of Florence. She gained her PhD in Public Archaeology from University College London. She is an International Executive Committee member of the Association of Critical Heritage Studies and sits on the advisory board of the Journal of Open Archaeology Data.

Bonacchi was elected as a fellow of the Society of Antiquaries of London on 10 October 2018.

Select publications
Nucciotti, M., Bonacchi, C. and Molducci, C. (Eds) 2019. Archeologia Pubblica in Italia. Florence: Florence University Press.
Bonacchi, C. and Krzyzanska, M. 2019. "Digital heritage research re-theorised: ontologies and epistemologies in a world of big data", International Journal of Heritage Studies 25. 
Bonacchi, C., Bevan, A., Keinan-Schoonbaert, A., Pett, D. and Wexler, J. 2019. "Participation in heritage crowdsourcing", Museum Management and Curatorship 34.
Bonacchi, C., Altaweel, M. and Krzyzanska, M. 2018. "The heritage of Brexit: Roles of the past in the construction of political identities through social media", Journal of Social Archaeology 18. 10.1177/1469605318759713
Bonacchi, C., Hingley, R. and Yarrow, T. 2016. "Exploring ancient identities in modern Britain". Archaeology International  19, 54–57.

References

Living people
Women classical scholars
Fellows of the Society of Antiquaries of London
20th-century archaeologists
21st-century archaeologists
Year of birth missing (living people)
Fellows of the Society of Antiquaries of Scotland
Italian archaeologists
Italian women archaeologists
Academics of the University of Stirling